Facundo Anthony "Cuno" Barragan (born June 20, 1932) is a former American professional baseball player. He attended Sacramento City College and California State University, Sacramento.

Cuno Barragan's only MLB home run came on his very first big-league at bat, on September 1, 1961 off left-hander Dick LeMay; 5,427 people witnessed this event, which came early in a 14-inning loss by the Cubs to the Giants at Wrigley Field on a Friday afternoon.

All told, he collected 33 career hits in the majors, with six doubles and a triple, with 14 runs batted in in 69 games played. He batted .202.

His Hispanic given name and its unique nickname, combined with his cup-of-coffee career, led the authors of The Great American Baseball Card Flipping, Trading and Bubble Gum Book  to make the following sarcastic comment next to the illustration of his Topps baseball card: "Who the hell is Cuno Barragan? And why are they saying those terrible things about him?"

In 1973, Barragan was inducted into the Mexican American Hall of Fame, an organization which honors individuals from the Sacramento area. In 2002, he was elected to the Sacramento City College Hall of Fame for baseball and football.

See also
 List of Major League Baseball players with a home run in their first major league at bat

References

External links

1932 births
Living people
Amarillo Gold Sox players
American baseball players of Mexican descent
Baseball players from Sacramento, California
Chicago Cubs players
Idaho Falls Russets players
Major League Baseball catchers
Portland Beavers players
Sacramento City Panthers baseball players
Sacramento Solons players
Sacramento State Hornets baseball players
Salt Lake City Bees players
Spokane Indians players